Another Stakeout is a 1993 American buddy cop action comedy film directed by John Badham and starring Richard Dreyfuss, Emilio Estevez, and Rosie O'Donnell. It is a sequel to the 1987 film, Stakeout. Unlike its predecessor, the film was neither a critical nor a commercial success.

Plot
Luella Delano (Cathy Moriarty), a witness against the Mafia is being hidden in the desert until the trial. A hitman blows up the house using a sewage removal truck to pump gas under it. The violent attempt against her kills her husband, several of her guards and she disappears.

Chris Lecce (Richard Dreyfuss) and Bill Reimers (Emilio Estevez), after an undercover detail goes wrong (the man who has been killing homeless people gets shot with Chris's gun), are called upon to stake out the lakeside home where Luella is believed to be.

Unlike their earlier stakeout, this time they are accompanied by Gina Garrett (Rosie O'Donnell) the assistant DA and her pet rottweiler 'Archie', their cover is husband, wife, and son.

When Chris arrives home, his girlfriend Maria (Madeleine Stowe) is kicking him out, as he will not marry her, although they have been together for seven years. Chris does not want to, as his family has the worst track record in marriage, including his own divorce.

However, he, Bill, and Gina must continue with their stakeout of Brian and Pam O'Hara to make sure Luella is safe. The trio are given use of a red convertible and a judge's summer house next to the O'Haras' as cover.

The trio meet the couple upon arrival, as Archie chases a cat onto their property. Bill sends Gina for a run after Brian the next morning. When all three are not watching, the O'Haras leave the house. Bill sneaks in to bug the place, but has to abort the mission.

Gina invites them to their house that night for a dinner party so Bill can plant several bugs around theirs. She and Chris freak out the couple by acting odd. Then things take a turn for the worse when Bill is knocked unconscious after being mistaken for a hit man.

Luana has subdued Bill, not knowing he is there to protect her. Her friends, the O'Haras find her with the bound, gagged and hooded man, who she insists they must kill. As she is about to shoot him at the end of the pier, he flips off it, freeing himself.

Gina and Chris appear, subduing Luana. In custody, she asks to talk to the O'Haras in person. Chris and Bill are packing up to leave when they spot Tony the hitman. Hurrying to warn them in the other house, there they are initially shot at as Luella insists it is they who are the hitmen.

Tony, kills the corrupt District Attorney for his interference. Then he takes Gina hostage, despite Chris and Bill having their guns drawn. While walking Gina at gunpoint past the pool in pursuit of Luella, Tony is attacked by Archie for threatening Gina and they both fall into the pool. He shoots at Luella but hits Gina in the shoulder instead, then gets shot and killed by Chris and Bill.

Both Chris and Bill are congratulated as heroes by the FBI, Luella and Gina. Chris returns to his apartment to call Maria, but she is already there. He proposes and she accepts, while Bill watches through binoculars from the car.

Cast
 Richard Dreyfuss as Detective Chris Lecce
 Emilio Estevez as Detective Bill Reimers
 Rosie O'Donnell as Assistant District Attorney Gina Garrett
 Dennis Farina as Brian O'Hara
 Marcia Strassman as Pam O'Hara
 Cathy Moriarty as Luella "Lu" Delano
 John Rubinstein as District Attorney Tommy Hassrick
 Miguel Ferrer as Tony Castellano
 Sharon Maughan as Barbara Burnside
 Christopher Doyle as McNamara
 Sharon Schaffer as Tilghman
 Jan Speck as Van Agent
 Frank C. Turner as "Unlucky"
 Dan Lauria as Captain Phil Coldshank
 Denalda Williams as Desk Sergeant
 Larry B. Scott as Garage Attendant
 Blu Mankuma as Seattle Detective Wills
 Thomas Mitchell as Seattle Detective Gilliam
 Scott Anderson as Reynaldo McGuire
 Madeleine Stowe as Maria McGuire

Reception
On Rotten Tomatoes the film holds an approval rating of 16% based on 25 reviews, with an average rating of 4.48/10. Audiences polled by CinemaScore gave the film an average grade of "B+" on an A+ to F scale.

Film critic Roger Ebert gave the film three stars in his review, the same as his rating for the first film, describing it as "chewing gum for the mind. This one holds its flavor better than most." Michael Wilmington of the Los Angeles Times wrote: "Another Stakeout (MPAA rated PG-13, for two comic-action violence scenes) is neither the best nor worst of a bloated lot of unimaginative sequels. It's pretty much what it's [sic] title suggests: another stakeout, another sequel. Another day, another dollar."

Box office

The sequel debuted at number 9 at the US box office with $5.4 million in its opening weekend. It eventually grossed just $20.2 million in the United States and Canada and $9.4 million internationally, for a worldwide total of $29.6 million, less than its $30 million budget.

References

External links

 
 
 
 
 

1993 films
1993 action comedy films
1990s buddy comedy films
1990s crime comedy films
American action comedy films
American buddy cop films
American police detective films
American crime comedy films
1990s English-language films
Films directed by John Badham
Films scored by Arthur B. Rubinstein
Films set in Seattle
Films shot in Vancouver
Touchstone Pictures films
Fictional portrayals of the Seattle Police Department
Films about the Federal Bureau of Investigation
American buddy comedy films
1990s buddy cop films
1990s American films